The Second Revolution refers to a 1913 revolt by the governors of several southern Chinese provinces as well as supporters of Sun Yat Sen and the Kuomintang against the Beiyang Government of the Republic of China led by Yuan Shikai. It was quickly defeated by Yuan's armies and led to the continued consolidation of Yuan's powers as President of the Republic of China.

The Bai Lang Rebellion was concurrent to the Second Revolution.

Background 

Kuomintang leader Song Jiaoren was assassinated in March 1913. Some people believe that Yuan Shikai was responsible, and although it has never been proven, he had already arranged the assassination of several pro-revolutionist generals. Animosity towards Yuan grew. In April he secured a Reorganization Loan of 25 million pounds sterling from Great Britain, France, Russia, Germany and Japan, without consulting the parliament first. The loan was used to finance Yuan's Beiyang Army.

On May 20, 1913, Yuan concluded a deal with Russia that granted Russia special privileges in Outer Mongolia and restricted Chinese right to station troops there. Kuomintang members of the Parliament accused Yuan of abusing his rights and called for his removal. On the other hand, the Progressive Party, which was composed of constitutional monarchists and supported Yuan, accused the Kuomintang of fomenting an insurrection. Yuan then decided to use military action against the Kuomintang.

There were several underlying reasons for the Second Revolution besides Yuan's abuse of power. First was that most Revolutionary Armies from different provinces were disbanded after the establishment of the Republic of China, and many officers and soldiers felt that they were not compensated for toppling the Qing Dynasty. These factors gave rise to much discontent against the new government among the military. Secondly, many revolutionaries felt that Yuan Shikai and Li Yuanhong were undeserving of the posts of presidency and vice presidency, because they acquired the posts through political maneuvering rather than participation in the revolutionary movement. Lastly, Yuan's use of violence (such as Song's assassination) dashed the Kuomintang's hope of achieving reforms and political goals through electoral means.

Events

Yuan Shikai's actions against KMT supporters 
In the beginning of May Li Chun led the 8th Division from Baoding to Wuhan, and also brought his crack troops to reinforce Shanghai. On June 9, President Yuan removed KMT supporter Li Liejun as Governor of Jiangxi, he was replaced by Vice President Li Yuanhong.. Some modern scholars have rehabilitated Li Liejun in this light.

June 13, Military Governor of Guangdong Hu Hanmin (Kuomintang) was appointed to a position in Tibet, he was replaced by Chen Jiongming. June 30, Anhui Governor Bai Wenwei (KMT) was also dismissed, on the same day Li Yuanhong made mass arrests of underground party leaders in Wuhan. At the behest of Jiujiang garrison commander Chen Tingxun, on July 3, Yuan sent the Beiyang Army 6th Division under command of Li Chun into Jiangxi.

Southern Provinces declare independence
On July 12th Li Liejun returned to Jiangxi and at hukou Proclaimed Jiangxi independent
On July 15, Huang Xing arrived at Nanjing, organized an anti-Yuan force, and announced Jiangsu independence. Jiangsu Governor Cheng Dequan was named commander of southern forces, however Cheng declined the offer and fled to Shanghai.

On July 17, Anhui governor Bai Wenwei, declared his province's independence. On the 18, Chen Qimei announced Shanghai independence. On July 18, Chen Jiongming responded to Sun's plea to declare Guangdong's independence. On July 19, Sun Daoren and Xu Zhongzhi announced Fujian independence over telegram.

On July 22, anti-Yuan forces were defeated around Xuzhou by the Beiyang Army 2nd Division led by Feng Guozhang and Zhang Xun and retreated to Nanjing. From the 22nd to 28th anti-Qing forces attempted to capture "江南制造局" but the Beiyang Army was able to resist the attack with assistance from the Beiyang Navy. On July 25, Tan Yankai declared independence in Hunan. On July 28, seeing the situation as hopeless, Huang Xing leaves Nanjing and returns to Hunan.

On July 26th, Long Jiguang's forces headed towards Zhaoqing where Li Yaohan of the Zhaoqing army joined him on the 30th and then on August 3rd, His army entered Sanshui District 

On July 31st, Ni Sichong's Beiyang force attacked Fengtai, and captured Huaiyuan County. On August 2nd, Fengtai fell to Beiyang forces.

On August 4 in Chongqing Xiong Kewu declared Sichuan independent. Yuan Shikai ordered Yunnan's general and warlord Tang Jiyao and his army into Sichuan to suppress the rebellion. Long Jiguang would be successful in this and defeated Xiong Kewu's forces. On the 8th He Haiming declared independence in Nanjing a second time, however that evening Chen Juhe went to Nanjing's 8th Division headquarters and cancelled the declaration. The next day Sun Daoren cancelled Fujian independence via telegram message.

On August 5th 16:00, Beiyang forces captured Shou County. On August 7th, Hu Wantai revolted against Anhui in support of Beiyang and On August 11th took control of the provincial capital of Anqing . 

On August 11, He Haiming again declared independence in Nanjing, and led 2000 soldiers in a bloody battle against the Beiyang Army.  On August 11th, Long Jiguang's forces began the attack on Guangzhou. August 13, the pro-Yuan Ji Army led by Long Jiguang took control of Guangzhou. On the same day in Hunan, Tan Yankai took to telegram to cancel independence, also the Beiyang Navy took Wusong, and later anti-Yuan forces in Jiading were dispersed. On August 18, the Beiyang Army under command of Li Chun captured Nanchang. On August 19th, Ni Sichong's Beiyang forces entered Hefei. He then reached Anqing on the 25th, Taking Wuhu on the 28th, and sending Hu Wantai to enter Huizhou. on the 29th. September 1 Zhang Xun's Wuwei Corps captured Nanjing. At this point every province had repealed independence, so Sun Yat Sen, Huang Xing, Chen Qimei all fled to Japan.

On September 11, Xiong Kewu abandoned Chongqing, dispersed his forces, assumed an alias and fled. The next day, Tang Jiyao and his Ji Army entered Chongqing and the Second Revolution was defeated in its entirety. After the failure of the Second Revolution, Sun Yat Sen again fled the country and re-established the secret society Revive China Society. In October 1913 an intimidated parliament formally elected Yuan Shikai President of the Republic of China, and the major powers extended recognition to his government. Duan Qirui and other trusted Beiyang generals were given prominent positions in the cabinet. To achieve international recognition, Yuan Shikai had to agree to autonomy for Outer Mongolia and Tibet. China was still to be suzerain, but it would have to allow Russia a free hand in Outer Mongolia and Tanna Tuva and Britain continuation of its influence in Tibet.

Seeing the situation for his party worsen, Sun Yat-sen fled to Japan in November 1913. Subsequently, Yuan gradually took over the government, using the military as the base of his power. He dissolved the national and provincial assemblies, and the House of Representatives and Senate were replaced by the newly formed "Council of State", with Duan Qirui, his trusted Beiyang lieutenant, as Prime Minister. He relied on the American-educated Tsai Tingkan for English translation and connections with western powers. Finally, Yuan had himself elected president to a five-year term, publicly labelled the KMT a seditious organization, ordered the KMT's dissolution, and evicted all its members from Parliament.

Aftermath
The KMT's "Second Revolution" ended in failure as Yuan's troops achieved complete victory over revolutionary uprisings. Provincial governors with KMT loyalties who remained willingly submitted to Yuan. Because those commanders not loyal to Yuan were effectively removed from power, the Second Revolution cemented Yuan's power.

In January 1914, China's Parliament was formally dissolved. To give his government a semblance of legitimacy, Yuan convened a body of 66 men from his cabinet who, on 1 May 1914, produced a "constitutional compact" that effectively replaced China's provisional constitution. The new legal status quo gave Yuan, as president, practically unlimited powers over China's military, finances, foreign policy, and the rights of China's citizens. Yuan justified these reforms by stating that representative democracy had been proven inefficient by political infighting.

After his victory, Yuan reorganized the provincial governments. Each province was supported by a military governor (都督) as well as a civil authority, giving each governor control of their own army. This helped lay the foundations for the warlordism that crippled China over the next two decades.

During Yuan's presidency, a silver "dollar" (yuan in Chinese) carrying his portrait was introduced. This coin type was the first "dollar" coin of the central authorities of the Republic of China to be minted in significant quantities. It became a staple silver coin type during the first half of the 20th century and was struck for the last time as late as the 1950s. They were also extensively forged.

See also
 1913 in China
 Xinhai Revolution
 Constitutional Protection Movement

References

1913 in China
20th-century revolutions
Kuomintang
Revolutions in China
Sun Yat-sen